CSKA Arena, formerly known as VTB Ice Palace and Legends Park, is an indoor multi-sport venue that is located in Moscow, Russia. Its main sponsor is VTB Bank.

CSKA Arena is a part of the Park of Legends renovation project on the former ZiL auto plant site. It includes the Arena, the Russian Hockey Museum with the Russian Hockey Hall of Glory, Watersport Arena, and Apartments Complex. It is located nearby the ZIL MCC and Avtozavodskaya Metro station.

History
The Ice Palace opened on April 26, 2015. It has been the home arena for KHL's club CSKA Moscow since 2018. 

From 2015 it was the home stadium for the Kontinental Hockey League ice hockey team Dynamo Moscow before they moved into their newly built own VTB Arena in January 2019. From 2017 to 2021, it was the home arena for Spartak Moscow before they announced plans to move into another Moscow Sports Palace Megasport.

In 2015, five of six matches of Channel One Cup were played in the Arena. In 2016, the arena hosted games of the 2016 IIHF World Championship.

Venues
The facility features three different indoor arenas, the "Large Arena," the "Small Arena," and a training facility.

The large arena has a seating capacity of 12,100 viewers for ice hockey and figure skating, 13,000 for basketball and 14,000 for wrestling, boxing, MMA, and concerts.

The small arena has a seating capacity of 3,500 viewers for ice hockey and figure skating, 4,400 for basketball and 5,000 for wrestling, boxing, |MMA, and concerts. The third arena, the training arena, has a capacity of 500.

Gallery

See also
 List of indoor arenas in Russia
 List of European ice hockey arenas

References

External links

 

Basketball venues in Russia
Boxing venues in Russia
HC Dynamo Moscow
Sports venue
Indoor arenas in Russia
Music venues in Russia
Indoor ice hockey venues in Russia
Kontinental Hockey League venues
Sports venues completed in 2015
Sports venues in Moscow
2015 establishments in Russia